The 1989 Mid-Eastern Athletic Conference men's basketball tournament took place March 3–5, 1989, at Greensboro Coliseum in Greensboro, North Carolina. South Carolina State defeated , 83–79 in the championship game, to win its first MEAC Tournament title.

The Bulldogs earned an automatic bid to the 1989 NCAA tournament as #15 seed in the East region.

Format
Eight of nine conference members participated, with play beginning in the quarterfinal round. Teams were seeded based on their regular season conference record.

Bracket

* denotes overtime period

References

MEAC men's basketball tournament
1988–89 Mid-Eastern Athletic Conference men's basketball season
MEAC men's basketball tournament